Matthew McNab (born 8 June 1998) is a Zimbabwe rugby union player, currently playing for the  in the 2022 Currie Cup First Division. His preferred position is centre or wing. He is the son of Zimbabwe mountainbiker Lee McNab who raced at the 2007 UCI African Mountain Bike Championships

Professional career
McNab represented Zimbabwe Academy in the 2019 Rugby Challenge. He was then named in the  squad for the 2022 Currie Cup First Division. He joined  in 2020, and joined  on loan in 2022.

References

External links
itsrugby.co.uk Profile

1998 births
Living people
Rugby union centres
Rugby union wings
Zimbabwean rugby union players
Zimbabwe international rugby union players
Zimbabwe Academy rugby union players
Hartpury University R.F.C. players
Worcester Warriors players
Zimbabwe Goshawks players